Erigeron procumbens is a North American species of flowering plant in the family Asteraceae known by the common name Corpus Christi fleabane, the name referring to a coastal city in Texas. The species grows along the coastal plain and coastal strand of the Gulf of Mexico, in the states of Veracruz, Tamaulipas, Texas, Louisiana, and Mississippi.

Erigeron procumbens is a perennial herb up to 40 centimeters (16 inches) tall, the stems very often procumbent (lying on the ground instead of growing straight up). The plant generally produces only one flower head per stem. Each head has 225–350 pink or white ray florets surrounding numerous yellow disc florets. The species grows in wet depressions between sand dunes as well as on roadsides, and on the edges of mudflats and salt marshes.

References

External links
Lady Bird Johnson Wildflower Center, University of Texas

procumbens
Plants described in 1768
Flora of the Southern United States
Flora of Northeastern Mexico